Shahi Qila (English: Royal Fort), also known as Karar Fort or Jaunpur Fort, is a fort built during the 14th century in Jaunpur, Uttar Pradesh, India. The fort is located close to the Shahi Bridge on the Gomti river.

Background
A tourist attraction of the Jaunpur city, it is located near Shahi Bridge of the Gomti river,  from Jaunpur.

Constructed by Ibrahim Naib Barbak, a chieftain of Firoz Shah Tughlaq, it was built using the material owned by temples and palaces of the Rathore kings of Kannauj. The fort was destroyed multiple times by rulers, including the Lodhis and the British Empire. It went through extensive renovations and repairs during the rule of the Mughal Empire.

History
The Kerar Kot fort once stood on the same site on the left (north) bank of the Gomti river. It contained a mosque and a spacious and stylish set of baths (hammam) installed by Barbak, the brother of Tughlaq. The fort's layout is an irregular quadrangle enclosed in stone walls. The walls surround raised earthworks. Most of the remains of the original structures are buried or in ruin.

The main gates face east. Its external surface is set with ashlar stone. A further outer gate was installed during the reign of the Mughal emperor Akbar under the patronage of the governor of Jaunpur, Min'im Khan, in the 16th century. It is designed in the shape of a flanking bastion. The spandrels or spaces between the arches of the outer gate were decorated with blue and yellow tiles. Ornamental niches are built into the walls of the outer gate.

The two-storey residential and administrative building or "palace" was built in a square layout. An interior pillared verandah or aiwan overlooked the ground floor from the first.

Bhool bhulaiya
It symbolises a perfect Turkish bath, commonly known as Hammam. The Hammam is partly underground, having both inlet and outlet channels, hot and cold water, and the like.

The Mosque
The mosque or masjid is likely the oldest building in Jaunpur township. It was a simple arcade of about  x  in the Bengali style.

It was supported by a  pillar having a Persian inscription inscribed on it, telling the story of the erection of the mosque in 1362 by Barbak. There are three low central domes, but instead of minars, there are two nearby stone pillars.

The outer gate has another inscription on the front, which appeals to everyone as "Hindus to read the Gita and Muslims to read the Koran, and Christians to read the Bible". The fort is named in the List of Monuments/Sites of Archaeological Survey of India of the Directorate of Archaeology, Uttar Pradesh. and List of Monuments of Archaeological Survey of India.

Entrance fee
The entrance is not free. The fee structure is different for Indians and foreigners. No fees are charged to children up to 15 years.

Indian citizens and visitors from SAARC (Bhutan, Nepal, Bangladesh, Pakistan, Sri Lanka, Afghanistan, and the Maldives) and BIMSTEC Countries (Sri Lanka, Nepal, Bhutan, Bangladesh, Myanmar, and Thailand) at 25 INR per head.

 Others -- US $2 or 100 INR per head

 Timings: The fort can be visited from 9.00 AM till 5.00 PM.

See also
 List of forts in Uttar Pradesh

References

Forts in Uttar Pradesh
Buildings and structures in Jaunpur, Uttar Pradesh
Tourist attractions in Jaunpur, Uttar Pradesh